"Whistle In" is a song written by Brian Wilson for American rock band the Beach Boys. It is the eleventh and final track on their 1967 album Smiley Smile.

Background

Like "You're Welcome" (the B-side to "Heroes and Villains"), "Whistle In" is a short chant sung by the Beach Boys. It features a driving honky-tonk piano and an electric bass line doubled by Mike Love's bass-baritone voice singing the line "dum, dum, dum, whistle in". Other backing and harmony vocals are shared by the Beach Boys, which Carl Wilson leads with the lines "remember the day, remember the night, all day long" similar to the 1964 Shangri-Las single "Remember (Walking in the Sand)".

It was erroneously speculated to have been sourced from a "Heroes and Villains" section entitled "Whistling Bridge". There is no discernible link between "Whistling Bridge" and "Whistle In" save for their titles.

"Whistle In" was later completed and released for Smiley Smile, the replacement for the aborted Smile album.

Cover versions

References

1967 songs
The Beach Boys songs
Songs written by Brian Wilson
Song recordings produced by the Beach Boys